Eduardo Andrés Julio Zaplana Hernández-Soro (born 3 April 1956) is a Spanish politician who served as Minister of Labour and Social Issues from 2002 to 2004, President of the Valencian Government from 1995 to 2002 and Spokesperson of the Partido Popular (PP) in the Spanish Congress of Deputies from 2004 to 2008.

Biography
A lawyer, Zaplana studied at the University of Alicante.
After involvement in the now defunct Union of the Democratic Centre (UCD), Zaplana joined PP. He served as mayor of Benidorm from 1991 to 1994; he also served in the Valencian Regional Parliament as a deputy, becoming president of the Valencian Community in 1995, a position he held until 24 July 2002. He resigned after being appointed Minister of Employment and Social Security, a post he held until the 2004 General Election.

He served as a senator from 2002 until 2004, when he was elected to the Spanish Congress, representing Valencia and becoming PP's main spokesman in Congress.

For 2008, he changed electoral districts, moving to Madrid, where he was fourth on the PP list. Following PP's election defeat in March 2008, he resigned as PP Spokesman, stating that he intended to become a backbench MP. On 29 April, he resigned as PP MP altogether, announcing that he would become a European delegate for Telefónica.

In 2017, the media reported some of his opinions about Spanish conservative leaders.

In May 2018, Eduardo Zaplana was arrested for money laundering and bribery. The general coordinator of PP, Fernando Martínez Maíllo, announced that party will suspend Zaplana's party membership.

Personal life
He is married with three children.

References

External links
Biography at Spanish Congress site. 
Transcription of telephone conversation between Eduardo Zaplana and Salvador Palop related to the Naseiro corruption case (in Spanish). 

1956 births
Living people
Presidents of the Valencian Government
Politicians from Cartagena, Spain
Members of the 8th Congress of Deputies (Spain)
Members of the 9th Congress of Deputies (Spain)
People's Party (Spain) politicians
Members of the Senate of Spain
Spanish prisoners and detainees
Mayors of places in the Valencian Community
Members of the 3rd Corts Valencianes
Members of the 4th Corts Valencianes
Members of the 5th Corts Valencianes